Ryazanka is a rural locality (a village) in Arkhangelskoye Rural Settlement, Sokolsky District, Vologda Oblast, Russia. The population was 37 as of 2002.

Geography 
Ryazanka is located 12 km northwest of Sokol (the district's administrative centre) by road. Perevoz is the nearest rural locality.

References 

Rural localities in Sokolsky District, Vologda Oblast